Erica Reef, also known as Enola Reef; ; Gabriela Silang Reef; ; Mandarin , is located in the SW of Dangerous Ground, 24km east-northeast of Mariveles Reef in the Spratly Islands. 
 
It is small, almost circular, with an outside radius about 1 km. It dries entirely at low tide, enclosing a shallow lagoon. A few rocks remain visible on the east side at high water but there is no obvious point of reference. The lagoon is too shallow to be of much interest and the outer reef is a steep slope rather than a drop-off, but it descends into very deep water. Healthy stony corals harbouring a myriad of reef creatures descend into the depths and many shoals of semi-pelagic fish are seen in the clear visibility.  On each reef the south walls are precipitous while their other boundaries are slopes, the walls are a result of prevailing currents and the direction of maximum sunlight encouraging coral growth.

It is one of the areas in the Spratly Islands occupied by Malaysia. The Royal Malaysian Navy has maintained an "offshore naval station" there called "Station Sierra" since 1999.  The reef is also claimed by the People's Republic of China, Republic of China (Taiwan), the Philippines, and Vietnam. The Filipino(Tagalog) name is named after Philippine revolutionary leader, Gabriela Silang.

References

External links
 Asia Maritime Transparency Initiative Island Tracker

Reefs of the Spratly Islands